Yangi-Yul (Yañı Yul) is a rural locality (a village) in Isyangulovsky Selsoviet, Zianchurinsky District, Bashkortostan, Russia. The population was 196 as of 2010. There are 5 streets.

Geography 
Yangi-Yul is located 5 km southwest of Isyangulovo (the district's administrative centre) by road. Novopavlovka is the nearest rural locality.

References 

Rural localities in Zianchurinsky District